Virginia Wade defeated Evonne Goolagong in the final, 6–4, 6–4 to win the women's singles tennis title at the 1972 Australian Open.

Margaret Court was the three-time reigning champion, but did not compete that year.

Seeds
A champion seed is indicated in bold text while text in italics indicates the round in which that seed was eliminated.

  Evonne Goolagong (final)
  Virginia Wade (champion)
  Gail Chanfreau (quarterfinals)
  Helen Gourlay (semifinals)
  Olga Morozova (quarterfinals)
  Kerry Harris (semifinals)
  Karen Krantzcke (second round)
  Barbara Hawcroft (quarterfinals)

Draw

Finals

Section 1

Section 2

External links
 1972 Australian Open – Women's draws and results at the International Tennis Federation

Women's Singles
Australian Open (tennis) by year – Women's singles
1972 in Australian women's sport
1972 Women's Tennis Circuit
1971 in Australian women's sport